Ballyboden St Enda's (CLG Baile Buadáin Naomh Éanna in Irish) is a Gaelic Athletic Association club located in Knocklyon,  South Dublin, Ireland.  The Club serves the Rathfarnham, Knocklyon, Ballycullen, Ballyboden, Ballyroan, Firhouse areas.  They offer hurling, camogie, Gaelic football, handball, and rounders.  They were founded in 1969 after the merger of 2 clubs in the Rathfarnham area – the Ballyboden Wanderers (founded 1910) and Rathfarnham St. Endas (founded 1966).

Their homeground, Páirc Uí Mhurchú is located on the Firhouse Road.  It was named Páirc Uí Mhurchú in 1984, in honour of founding member and first chairman of Ballyboden St Enda's, Ned Murphy (Éamonn Ó Murchú) (1908–1981).

According to The Irish Times, Ballyboden is "almost certainly... the biggest sports club in Europe", with 172 teams representing it in 2020.

Honours

Ladies' Senior Football
The 'Boden Ladies' Senior Football team has won 2 All-Ireland, 6 Leinster and 10 Dublin Championships. 
Ballyboden's women's senior football team were crowned All-Ireland Club champions in 2004 with a win over Donoughmore from Cork with a final scoreline of 2–7 to 1–9. They retained their title in 2005. In total, they have won 6 Leinster titles (2001, 2002, 2004, 2005, 2006, and 2007), and have captured ten county titles – including nine consecutive titles with victory over Na Fianna in 2008.
In addition, ten Senior League Division 1 titles have been won.

Ladies' Senior Camogie
The Ladies' Senior Camogie team have captured 10 Dublin Senior Championships, as well as four Senior A Dublin League titles (1999, 2001, 2009, 2010) and a Senior Leinster Championship title (2008).

Senior Football
Ballyboden won their first Dublin Senior Football Championship in 1995, defeating Erin's Isle by a single point – 1.07 to 0.09. They also completed their first league and championship double that year, winning Dublin League Division 1. The club gained their second Dublin Senior Football Championship in 2009, beating local rivals St Jude's by a scoreline of 2.12 to 1.13. A third county title was claimed in 2015 when St. Vincents were beaten on a scoreline of 2.08 to 0.10 and won again in 2019, beating Thomas Davis GAA 0–15 to 0–9. 'Boden were also beaten county finalists in 2004, losing to Kilmacud Crokes (1–11 to 2–02). In addition, they have won three Dublin AFL Division 1 titles (1995, 2003, 2016), as well as finishing runners up in 2018 and 2019. The club have also claimed four U/21 Dublin Championships (1995, 1997, 2003, 2014) and six Dublin Minor Football Championships (1990, 1993, 1996, 1998, 2002, 2010).

On 6 December 2015, 'Boden claimed their first Leinster Senior Club Football Championship title, defeating Portlaoise on a scoreline of 2.09 to 1.11, with substitute Aran Waters kicking a dramatic late winning point.

Following victory over Clonmel Commercials in the All Ireland semi-final on a scoreline of 0–15 to 0–10 (following extra time), 'Boden went on to contest their first All Ireland Football final on St. Patrick's day in Croke Park. Following a blistering start that saw them score two goals in the first fifteen minutes, 'Boden won a famous victory, beating favourites Castlebar Mitchels convincingly on a scoreline of 2–14 to 0–07. Andy McEntee, who went on to manage Meath, was manager of Ballyboden at the time.

A second Leinster Club title was added in 2019 following a narrow 0–8 to 0–6 victory over Éire Óg of Carlow. 

They were without their manager Anthony Rainbow during the COVID-19 pandemic when he was held within County Kildare to stop the spread.

Senior hurling
The 'Boden Senior A hurling team made history in 2007 when the side claimed the club's first senior championship crown to complete the full set of senior titles. The final score on an historic night was Ballyboden St Endas 2 – 13 St. Vincents 1 – 5. This victory was achieved after the club had finished as runners up in the Dublin Championship on five previous occasions (1983, 1988, 2001, 2004, 2006). 
They retained their title in 2008 with a victory against southside rivals Kilmacud Crokes. In 2009 they made it three in a row when they defeated old foes, Craobh Chiarán. Captained by Gary Maguire, a fourth successive title was added in 2010 as 'Boden became the first team to achieve this landmark since 1928. 2011 saw Boden, under captain David Curtin, win the SHC for the fifth year in a row. A sixth title was won in 2013, before their most recent title in 2018 following a three-point win over Kilmacud Crokes after a replay. The League title was also added in 2018 following a 4-point victory in the league final over Na Fianna to complete a league/championship double. In 2020, 'Boden narrowly lost out to Cuala in a thrilling final (2-20 to 1-18) in Parnell Park. 
In June 2010 the club became the first Dublin club to win the Leinster Senior League Division 1. They achieved this (without their 7 Dublin Senior players) by beating Castlecomer after extra time in Nolan Park on a scoreline of 3–21 to 3–19. Further Leinster Senior League titles were added in 2013 and 2016. 
Ballyboden have also won nine Dublin Senior Hurling Division 1 league titles (1993, 1999, 2004, 2007, 2009, 2012, 2013, 2017, 2018), nine Dublin U/21 and ten Dublin Minor championships.

Dublin Senior Championship Wins
 Dublin Senior Football Championship Winners (4 titles): 1995, 2009, 2015, 2019
 Dublin Senior Hurling Championship Winners (7 titles): 2007, 2008, 2009, 2010, 2011, 2013, 2018
 Dublin Senior B Hurling Championship: Winner 2012
 Dublin Senior 2 Football Championship: Winners 2017
 Dublin Senior Camogie Championship Winners (10 titles): 1999, 2000, 2001, 2006, 2008, 2010, 2011, 2012, 2013, 2014
 Dublin Ladies' Senior Football Championship Winners (10 titles): 2000, 2001, 2002, 2003, 2004, 2005, 2006, 2007, 2008, 2010

Dublin Senior League Division 1 Titles
 Dublin Senior Football League Division 1 Winners (3 titles): 1995, 2003, 2016
 Dublin Senior Hurling League Division 1 Winners (9 titles): 1993, 1999, 2004, 2007, 2009, 2012, 2013, 2017, 2018
 Dublin Senior Camogie League Division 1 Winners (4 titles): 1999, 2001, 2009, 2010
 Dublin Senior Ladies' Football League Division 1 Winners (9 titles): 2000, 2001, 2002, 2003, 2004, 2005, 2008, 2009, 2010

Other achievements
 All-Ireland Senior Club Football Championship Winners (1) 2015-16
 All-Ireland Ladies' Club Football Championship Winners (2) 2004, 2005
 Leinster Senior Club Football Championship Winners (2) 2015–16, 2019-20
 Leinster Senior Club Hurling Championship Runners-Up 2007–08, 2018-19
 Leinster Ladies' Senior Club Football Championship  Winners (6) 2001, 2002, 2004, 2005, 2006, 2007
 Dublin Intermediate Football Championship Winners 1971
 Dublin Intermediate Hurling Championship Winners (3) 1974, 1996, 1997
 Dublin Junior Hurling Championship Winners (3) 1973, 1988, 2000
 Dublin Junior B Hurling Championship (1) 1996
 Dublin Junior C Hurling Championship (1) 2015
 Dublin Junior E Hurling Championship (1) 2015
 Dublin Under 21 Hurling Championship Winners (9) 1996, 1997, 1999, 2000, 2003, 2006, 2007, 2010, 2011
 Dublin Under 21 Football Championship Winners (4) 1995, 1997, 2003, 2014
 Dublin Minor A Hurling Championship (10) 1994, 1995, 1996, 1997, 1999, 2000, 2001, 2006, 2008, 2013
 Dublin Minor B Hurling Championship Winners 2008
 Dublin Minor C Hurling Championship Winners 2003, 2015
 Dublin Minor D Hurling Championship Winners 2013, 2016
 Dublin Minor E Hurling Championship Winners 2008
 Dublin Minor A Football Championship Winners 1990, 1993, 1996, 1998, 2002, 2010, 2021
 Dublin Minor B Football Championship Winners 1994, 2000
 Dublin Minor D Football Championship Winners 2012
 Dublin Minor E Football Championship Winners 2011
 Dublin Junior B Football Championship Winners 2011
 Dublin Junior C Football Championship Winners 2004, 2012

Notable players

Senior inter-county men's footballers
 Dublin

 Armagh
 Enda McNulty
 Donegal
 Paul Durcan

Senior inter-county hurlers
 Dublin

 Wexford
 Malachy Travers

Senior inter-county camogie players
 Dublin
 Ciara Lucey
 Emer Lucey
 Rachel Ruddy

Senior inter-county ladies' footballers
 Dublin
 Rachel Ruddy

Professional Australian rules footballers
 Brisbane Lions
 James Madden

 Melbourne
 Jim Stynes

Managers

Football

Hurling

References

External links
 
 "How a loophole in the GAA rulebook helped Ballyboden win their first Dublin football crown: The first Dublin SFC Ballyboden St Enda's lifted in 1995 arrived in controversial circumstances". The42.ie. 27 Spt 2020.

 
1969 establishments in Ireland
Gaelic games clubs in South Dublin (county)
Gaelic football clubs in South Dublin (county)
Hurling clubs in South Dublin (county)
Rathfarnham